American Fable is a 2016 American thriller film written and directed by Anne Hamilton. The film stars Peyton Kennedy, Richard Schiff, Kip Pardue, Marci Miller, Gavin MacIntosh and Zuleikha Robinson. The film was released on February 17, 2017, by IFC Midnight.

Plot

Young Gitty, an 11-year-old girl living on a farm in 1980s rural America, tries not to worry about her family losing the farm and seeks to escape the stress of her home by exploring the farm and its lands. She is shocked to discover, however, that the developer buying up local farms is now seemingly being kept prisoner in the family's old abandoned grain silo at the edge of the farm. Gitty begins spending time with the man, ultimately finding herself torn between loyalty to what she thinks is right, and loyalty to her own family. All is not as it may seem, though, as the family finds itself involved with individuals who are like something out of a fairy tale.

Cast 
Peyton Kennedy as Gitty
Richard Schiff as Jonathan
Kip Pardue as Abe 
Marci Miller as Sarah
Gavin MacIntosh as Martin
Zuleikha Robinson as Vera
Charlie Babbo as Michael
Spencer Moss as Heidi
Rusty Schwimmer as Ethel
Theresa Tilly as Anna Winters

Release
The film premiered at South by Southwest on March 13, 2016. On August 16, 2016, IFC Midnight acquired distribution rights to the film. The film was released on February 17, 2017, by IFC Midnight.

Reception
On review aggregator Rotten Tomatoes, American Fable holds an approval rating of 75%, based on 16 reviews, and an average rating of 7.26/10. Metacritic reports a score of 55/100 based on 8 critics, indicating "mixed or average reviews".

References

External links
 
 

2016 films
2016 thriller films
American thriller films
2010s English-language films
Films set in Wisconsin
Films shot in Wisconsin
Films set in the 1980s
2010s American films